The Fine Arts Building is a low-rise, 6-story historic building located at 1017 Southwest Morrison Street in downtown Portland, Oregon. Completed in 1906, the Fine Arts Building has long been home to studios of Portland teaching musicians, artists and artisans. Portland's popular Alpha-Centauri used book store operated in the ground level of the building during the 1970s. The vintage store Ray's Ragtime was located in the building's ground floor from 1986 to 2016.

External links
 
 Fine Arts Building at Emporis

1906 establishments in Oregon
Buildings and structures completed in 1906
Buildings and structures in Portland, Oregon
Southwest Portland, Oregon